"How It Was Supposed to Be" is the third single released from Ryan Leslie's debut self-titled album.

Music videos
There were three music videos made for this song. 
 The first video released in December 2008, takes place in a building. It also has an alternate instrumental, having more of a rock-influenced sound than the original.
 The second (official) music video consists of a more military-theme. It starts with Ryan and three other men crooning and deals with Leslie shipping out to sea. While he is on stage performing, a man played by Tyson Beckford tries to steal his girlfriend. Which leads to a fight between the two at the end of the video. This version was released to BET's 106 & Park on January 16, 2009, and later ranked at #64 on BET's Notarized: Top 100 Videos of 2009 countdown.

Remixes
"How It Was Supposed to Be" (Official Remix) - Ryan Leslie featuring Jadakiss

Charts

References

External links
 Music Video
 Rock Version Music Video

2008 singles
Ryan Leslie songs
Song recordings produced by Ryan Leslie
Songs written by Ryan Leslie
2008 songs
Universal Records singles